William Albright may refer to:

William F. Albright (1891–1971), evangelical Methodist archaeologist, biblical authority, linguist and expert on ceramics
William Albright (musician) (1944–1998), American composer, pianist and organist
William Donald Albright (1881–1946), Canadian agriculturalist and journalist
Will Albright (fl. 1950), American racecar driver

See also
Bill Albright (1929–2013), American football player